Tileh Molla (also Romanized as Tīleh Mollā) is a village in Emamzadeh Seyyed Mahmud Rural District, Sardasht District, Dezful County, Khuzestan Province, Iran. At the 2006 census, its population was 23, in 4 families. The climate of Tileh Molla is of hot-summer Mediterranean climate.

References 

Populated places in Dezful County